Motta Montecorvino is a town, comune (municipality), former bishopric and present Latin Catholic titular see in the province of Foggia, Apulia, southeast Italy.

The city was losing its population in the early 15th century, and then an earthquake on 5 December 1456 reduced it to rubble and ruins, apart from a guard tower. Even its cathedral was destroyed.

References

External links 
 Official website

Cities and towns in Apulia